New Asbury Methodist Episcopal Meeting House, now known as Asbury United Methodist Church, is a historic church in Middle Township, Cape May County, New Jersey, about six miles north of  Cape May Court House.

It was built in 1852 and added to the National Register of Historic Places in 1980.

It should not be confused with the First United Methodist Church in Cape May Court House which stands immediately north of the Old Cape May County Courthouse Building.

See also
National Register of Historic Places listings in Cape May County, New Jersey
Asbury United Methodist Church Swainton Homepage

References

Methodist churches in New Jersey
Churches on the National Register of Historic Places in New Jersey
Churches completed in 1852
19th-century Episcopal church buildings
Churches in Cape May County, New Jersey
Middle Township, New Jersey
National Register of Historic Places in Cape May County, New Jersey
19th-century Methodist church buildings in the United States
1852 establishments in New Jersey
Methodist Episcopal churches in the United States